Secondary Professional School in Stará Turá (Slovak: Stredná odborná škola Stará Turá) is secondary school in Stará Turá, Slovakia. Established on 1 September 2003 merging Secondary Industrial School of Electrical Engineering (Slovak: Stredná priemyselná škola elektrotechnická) and Secondary Vocational School of Electrical Engineering (Slovak: Stredné odborné učilište elektrotechnické) as Associated Secondary School of Electrical Engineering (Slovak: Združená stredná škola elektrotechnická) and on 1 September 2008 was renamed to Secondary Professional School. In 2018 it underwent reconstruction of the exterior facade and dining room, and was added a new rest area for school pupils. In December 2019 was finished reconstruction of the main part of the school gym and dressing rooms.

Fields of study

Fields of study of the secondary vocational school education
 Mechanic adjuster
 Computer network technician
 Mechanic electro technician
 Digital media Graphic Designer
 Intelligent and digital system administrator

Fields of study of the secondary industrial school education
 Information & networking technologies
 Electrical engineering

Apprenticeship fields of study
 Electro mechanical 
 Metal worker

References

External links
 Official website
 EduPage website

Education in Slovakia
Secondary schools in Slovakia